"Slut Me Out" is a single by American rapper NLE Choppa, released on April 15, 2022 by No Love Entertainment and Warner. It was produced by CashMoneyAP and FinesseGTB.

Content
The song has a fast tempo and features sexually explicit lyrics, finding NLE Choppa detailing sex (even suggesting performing the act in church, on the airplane, or at a basketball game) while also boasting about his vegan lifestyle.

Music video
An official music video was released on April 22, 2022. Directed by Ben Marc, it sees NLE Choppa dancing and relaxing with many women, as well as having two different sexual partners in an airplane bathroom.

Charts

References

2022 singles
2022 songs
NLE Choppa songs
Songs written by NLE Choppa
Songs written by CashMoneyAP
Warner Records singles
Dirty rap songs